Daks or variation, may refer to:

Events
 Daks Day, or Groundhog Day
 Daks Tournament, a golf tournament in England, UK

Companies, business, organizations
 DAKS, a British fashion house
 DAKS Simpson, a department store in Piccadilly, Westminster, London, England, UK
 Dakota Short Line (DAKS), see List of reporting marks: D

Other uses
 daks, or sweatpants
 Daks Davidson (born 1998), an Australian AFLW player of Australian-rules football

See also

 
 DAK (disambiguation)
 DACS (disambiguation)
 Dack (disambiguation)